Peter Francis Newell (August 31, 1915 – November 17, 2008) was an American college men's basketball coach and basketball instructional coach. He coached for 15 years at the University of San Francisco, Michigan State University, and the University of California, Berkeley, compiling an overall record of 234 wins and 123 losses. 

He led California to the NCAA title in 1959, and a year later coached the gold medal-winning U.S. team at the 1960 Summer Olympics, a team that would be inducted as a unit to the Naismith Memorial Basketball Hall of Fame in 2010. After his coaching career ended, he ran a world-famous instructional basketball camp and served as a consultant and scout for several National Basketball Association (NBA) teams.

Early life
Born in Vancouver, British Columbia, Newell grew up in Los Angeles, California. Encouraged by his mother, he had small roles in several movies before he turned ten. It is even said that Charlie Chaplin considered him for the title role in his film The Kid (1921), which was later played by Jackie Coogan. 

Newell graduated from St. Agnes High School and was a classmate of Phil Woolpert at Loyola University of Los Angeles (now Loyola Marymount University), and played on its basketball and baseball teams.

Coaching career
After serving in the United States Navy from 1942 to 1946, Newell was appointed head men's basketball coach at the University of San Francisco in 1946. During his four-year tenure at USF, Newell compiled a 70–37 record and coached the Dons to the 1949 National Invitation Tournament championship. In 1950 he accepted an appointment as head coach at Michigan State University, where he stayed until 1954.

Newell returned to the West Coast in 1954 when he was hired as head coach at the University of California, Berkeley. Newell was very successful at Cal, compiling a  record, winning four consecutive PCC/AAWU titles from 1957 to 1960, and leading the Golden Bears to two straight appearances in the NCAA tournament championship game—which they won in 1959. Newell himself earned national Coach of the Year honors in 1960. At Berkeley, he became a faculty initiate of the Nu chapter of Phi Kappa Tau fraternity where player Darrall Imhoff was a member.

Newell also coached the U.S. men's Olympic basketball team to a gold medal in the 1960 Summer Olympics in Rome, leading a talented squad that featured future National Basketball Association (NBA) stars and Hall of Famers Walt Bellamy, Oscar Robertson, Jerry West, and Jerry Lucas. His win in the Olympics made him one of only three coaches to win the "Triple Crown" of NIT, NCAA, and Olympic championships. Newell is also known to have introduced the reverse-action offense in the late 1950s.

After being advised by doctors to give up coaching because of stress, he served as the Athletic Director at Cal from 1960 to 1968.

NBA work
After retiring from coaching, Newell served as team executive or scout for several National Basketball Association (NBA) teams.  He served as general manager of the San Diego Rockets from 1968 to 1971, until the team was sold to Houston in June, 1971.  After a short stint in Houston, to assist with the transfer, Pete returned to the west coast and later joined the Los Angeles Lakers.  As general manager of the Lakers, he was instrumental in trading for star center Kareem Abdul-Jabbar from the Milwaukee Bucks. He served as the Director of Player Development for the NBA. He retired from his job as Lakers general manager in 1976 to spend more time with his ailing wife.

Basketball camps
Considered "America's Basketball Guru", Newell conducted an annual training camp for centers and forwards known simply as "Big Man Camp", which has since been informally dubbed "Pete Newell's Big Man Camp". The camp originated when word spread that Newell was working with Kermit Washington. After Washington's game rapidly improved, more and more big men started to work with Newell, and he later opened the camp. The camp's impressive participants list features over 200 current and former NBA players. Newell attracted this list of players due to his reputation of teaching footwork, being what one publication described as "The Footwork Master". Former attendees include Shaquille O'Neal, Hakeem Olajuwon, Bill Walton, and many others. The camp was almost seen as standard for players coming out of college into the NBA; according to ESPN's Ric Bucher, "[f]or the past 24 years, every big man of any significance has spent at least one summer week trying to get close enough to Pete." From the time Newell opened the camp in 1976 until his death, he never accepted any money for his services, stating that "I owe it to the game. I can never repay what the game has given me." The camp has taken place in Honolulu, Hawaii and most recently Las Vegas, Nevada.

In 2001 Newell opened his version of the Big Man Camp for women and dubbed it "Pete Newell's Tall Women's Basketball Camp" with the following simple sentence serving as a summary of its intentions: "The Pete Newell Tall Women's Basketball Camp goal is to continue to do what Pete Newell has done his whole life-to teach the fundamentals and footwork of the game of basketball to young players."

Personal life

Newell's wife, Florence, died in 1984. His four sons have all been involved with basketball. His son, Pete Newell Jr., coached the Santa Cruz High School boys' basketball team to the California state championship in 2005. Greg Newell was a longtime executive at  Converse. Another son, Tom Newell, is a longtime NBA scout and assistant coach who has recently worked on international basketball projects in China and Russia. Tom currently is a Fox Sports studio commentator in the network's Northwest region. His 3rd son, Roger, was the first person to bring computer software and analytics to the NBA in 1982 thru 2000 with the Newell Productivity System. This same computer software system was used throughout Jim Harrick's tenure at UCLA including their NCAA Championship season. Roger was also a consultant at Hollywood Park racetrack from 1990 to 1999
before the track was sold to Churchill Downs.

Death
Newell died at Rancho Santa Fe, California on November 17, 2008, at age 93.

Legacy

In 1979 Newell was inducted into the Naismith Memorial Basketball Hall of Fame as a contributor, and in 2010 the 1960 Olympic team he coached was inducted into the Hall as a unit. An annual college basketball tournament was held in his honor in Oakland, California, and frequent participants in the Pete Newell Challenge included USF and Cal—the very schools where Newell coached. In addition in 1987 Cal dedicated the court in Harmon Gym as "Pete Newell Court".

In 1999, author Bruce Jenkins published a biography of Newell entitled A Good Man.

Since 2000, the National Association of Basketball Coaches has annually presented the Pete Newell Big Man Award to the top frontcourt player in the nation.

In an interview with Mike Greenberg on ESPN's Mike and Mike in the Morning on January 2, 2007, Bob Knight singled Newell out as one of the greatest coaches in men's college basketball history. Knight stated that although he had not won as many championships as some other coaches he felt "he was as good as anybody who's ever coached this game." Newell's influence on basketball is often stated in what would seem to be almost exaggerated terms by many Hall of Fame coaches and players. However, his contributions to the game of basketball have been so great that according to many Newell has perhaps had as much or more influence on the game of basketball as any person in the modern era.

Head coaching record

Basketball

Source:

Selected bibliography
Basketball Methods (1962) with John Benington
Basketball: The Sports Playbook (1976)
Basketball Post Play (1995)
Pete Newell's Defensive Basketball: Winning Techniques and Strategies (Art & Science of Coaching) (2001)

See also
 List of NCAA Division I Men's Final Four appearances by coach

References

Sources
Chin, Oliver Clyde. The Tao of Yao: Insights from Basketball's Brightest Big Man, California: Frog, LTD. 2003 
Mandelbaum, Michael. The Meaning Of Sports: why americans watch baseball, football and basketball and what they see when they do, New York: Public Affairs 2004 
Ramsay, Jack and Halberstam, David. Dr. Jack's Leadership Lessons Learned From a Lifetime in Basketball, New Jersey: John Wiley & Sons. 2004

External links
 

1915 births
2008 deaths
American men's basketball players
American Olympic coaches
Basketball coaches from California
Basketball players from Vancouver
California Golden Bears athletic directors
California Golden Bears men's basketball coaches
Canadian emigrants to the United States 
Canadian expatriate basketball people in the United States
Canadian men's basketball coaches
Canadian men's basketball players
Canadian sportswriters
FIBA Hall of Fame inductees
Houston Rockets general managers
Los Angeles Lakers executives
Loyola Marymount Lions men's basketball players
Michigan State Spartans men's basketball coaches
Naismith Memorial Basketball Hall of Fame inductees
San Francisco Dons baseball coaches
San Francisco Dons men's basketball coaches
Sportspeople from Los Angeles
United States men's national basketball team coaches
United States Navy personnel of World War II
United States Navy sailors
Writers from Los Angeles
Writers from Vancouver
Basketball players from Los Angeles